Atkamba Airport  is an airport serving Atkamba, in the Western Province of Papua New Guinea.

References

Airports in Papua New Guinea
Western Province (Papua New Guinea)